HMS Dacres (K472) was a , built in the United States as a , and transferred to the Royal Navy under the terms of Lend-Lease, which served in World War II.

The ship was laid down as Duffy (DE-268) on 7 April 1943 by the Boston Navy Yard, Boston, Massachusetts, and launched on 19 May 1943. Transferred to the Royal Navy and commissioned as Dacres on 28 August 1943, the ship was named after Vice Admiral James Richard Dacres (1749–1810).

Service history
Dacres was attached to the B4 Escort Group based at Belfast, which comprised three destroyers and two Captain class frigates ( and ), and carried out escort duties in the Atlantic.

Her aft three-inch (76 mm) gun and all the depth charge gear was removed and the superstructure extended to provide accommodation for extra Staff Officers; two deck houses were built for communications equipment and a small main mast added to support more aerials. Four more 20 mm Oerlikons were fitted, and a number of radar sets installed.

For the invasion Dacres sailed from Portsmouth, even though her forward motor room had flooded, which compelled her to sail on only one engine. However she could still make about 16 knots, which was enough for her to lead in her convoy of assault ships to her group position off Sword on schedule at daybreak on D-Day – 6 June 1944.

As the Allied forces moved inland the staff officers were transferred ashore, and Dacres joined  Kingsmill in patrolling the Normandy anchorage until August, when she sailed for Portsmouth, salvaging an abandoned Liberty ship on the way. At Portsmouth dockyard she was stripped of the additional superstructure and guns, and restored to working order, before returning to Belfast in early 1945 to join the 10th Escort Group. Although the group sank three U-boats during February Dacres was not credited with helping in any of these kills.

In April 1945 she was transferred to the 15th Escort Group until VE Day, after which she was put into reserve until returned to the United States Navy on 26 January 1946. Dacres was sold for scrapping on 14 December 1946.

See also
List of destroyer escorts of the United States Navy
List of frigate classes of the Royal Navy
List of Captain class frigates
List of Allied warships in the Normandy landings

References
 The Captain Class Frigates Association

External links
 uboat.net HMS Dacres

 

Captain-class frigates
Evarts-class destroyer escorts
World War II frigates of the United Kingdom
Ships built in Boston
1943 ships
Ships transferred from the United States Navy to the Royal Navy